Arnold Holmboe (11 March 1873 – 27 July 1956) was a Norwegian politician for the Liberal Party. He was mayor of Tromsø, two-term member of the Norwegian Parliament as well as Minister of Justice from 1922 to 1923 and Minister of Finance from 1924 to 1926.

Personal life
He was born in Malm as the son of farmer Anton Christian Holmboe (1839–1911) and his wife Elen Berthine Arntsdatter Stjernen (1849–1902). He had several younger sisters. He was a distant relative of Otto Holmboe (1710–1773), and his grandfather Hans Fredrik was a third cousin of academics Bernt Michael and Christopher Andreas Holmboe.

In 1904 Arnold Holmboe married Dagmar Theodora Dahlmann. The couple had one son.

Career
He took higher education, graduated as cand.jur. in 1900 and then worked in Steigen for one year and Harstad for two years. In 1903 he was hired as an attorney in Tromsø. He was a member of Tromsø city council from 1907 to 1922, serving as mayor in the periods 1907 to 1908, 1913 to 1914 and 1916 to 1917. He was also CEO of the local savings bank Tromsø Sparebank from 1913 to 1928.

He was elected to the Norwegian Parliament in 1922, representing the Market towns of Nordland, Troms and Finnmark. On 24 August the same year, he was appointed Minister of Justice and the Police in the second cabinet Blehr. His seat in Parliament was taken by Knut Nilsen Evanger. Holmboe later lost the job when the second cabinet Blehr fell in March 1923. However, in July 1924 Holmboe returned as Minister of Finance and Customs in the first cabinet Mowinckel. That cabinet fell in March 1926. Holmboe then stood for election to Parliament, and served one last term from 1928 to 1930.

From 1928 to 1943 he was the CEO of Vinmonopolet.

As a part of the legal purge in Norway after World War II, Holmboe was a member of the Undersøkelseskommisjonen av 1945.

References

1873 births
1956 deaths
Members of the Storting
Ministers of Finance of Norway
Government ministers of Norway
Liberal Party (Norway) politicians
Politicians from Tromsø
Mayors of places in Troms
Norwegian jurists
Ministers of Justice of Norway